Víctor Damián Sáez (12 April 1776, in Budia – 3 February 1839, in Sigüenza) was a Spanish priest and politician, canon of Sigüenza and Toledo, bishop of Tortosa and private confessor of King Ferdinand VII. In 1823, the King appointed him as Secretary of State (Prime Minister) and was the first prime minister to chair the newly created Council of Ministers in 1823.

Biography 
Deeply linked to the ultra-absolutist sectors, he was King Ferdinand VII's trusted person. During the Liberal Triennium (1820–1823), he was forced by the progressive to push him away but after the fall of the constitutional regimen in 1823, Damián returned to the circles of power. In the last months of the Triennium, in April 1823, the King appointed him as Acting First Secretary of State (acting prime minister), a position that allowed him to command the absolutist reaction to the constitutional government of the Liberal Triennium. He did it with such rigor that more moderate absolutists such as Carlos Martínez de Irujo, 1st Marquess of Casa Irujo, requested the King to dismiss him in the name of the powers of the Holy Alliance.

On the same day as the King's landing in Spain on 1 October 1823, the monarch ratified his confessor as Minister of State. On November 19, King Ferdinand issued a decree addressed to Damián, ratifying Damián as prime minister and creating the Council of Ministers. When the king arrived in Madrid on December 2, he dismissed Damián as prime minister forced by foreign protests in the face of the intensity and extreme harshness with which Damián dedicated himself to persecuting progressive elements.

After the death of the King in 1833, he was accused of favoring the king's brother's aspirations to seize the throne from three-year-old Queen Isabella II. His brother and his nephew took refuge with him in Sigüenza, where the bishop had to remain hidden on the ground floor of the house of a friend, in which he soon died of an illness acquired on the journey. After the end of the First Carlist War, his nephew returned to Sigüenza to give a dignified burial to the mortal remains of his uncle and he buried him in the Tortosa Cathedral.

References 

1776 births
1777 births
1839 deaths
Prime Ministers of Spain